Khallikote Unitary University, formerly known as Khallikote Autonomous College, is a co-educational state university situated in Brahmapur, Odisha on the eastern coast of India. Founded as Union College in 1878, the institution became a university in 2021. The university has a student enrolment of nearly 5,000. It is one of the oldest educational institutes in Odisha.

History

The present university began as a Government Zilla School in 1856 and later upgraded for Intermediate classes (F.A. classes) with the name of Union College in 1878. And subsequently changed its name to Native College.

With major financial crisis in around 1893, for the survival of the institution the District Magistrate of Ganjam (A.W.B. Higgins, ICS) approached the Raja Saheb Harihar Mardaraj Deo of Khallikote who donated a lakh of rupees for the endowment fund. It was renamed in 1893 as Khallikote College in the honor of late Raja Saheb.

The college was affiliated to Madras University until 1936 when Berhampur was in the Madras Presidency. After 1936, when Orissa became a separate province, the college was affiliated to Patna University.
From 1944, Degree classes started in Arts, Science and Commerce at Khallikote College under affiliation to Utkal University. Postgraduate programmes were also introduced in four subjects in 1963.

The college became affiliated to Berhampur University after its establishment in 1967. The college management was handed over to Government of Odisha from 1971.

Journey to University
The college has given autonomy since 1990 and renamed it as Khallikote Autonomous College.

The Khallikote Cluster University was established as the first cluster university in Odisha on 30 May 2015, under the RUSA scheme. It was started to give affiliation, resource distribution and to tackle staff crunch among age old Khallikote (Autonomous) College, Berhampur; Sashi Bhusan Rath Government Women's College, Berhampur; Binayak Acharya College, Berhampur; Government Science College, Chhatrapur; and Gopalpur College, Gopalpur.

The cluster headquarter was the Khallikote College campus. By 2021, the cluster university has ceased its operations and merged with Berhampur University.

With major amendments, Khallikote Autonomous College has been upgraded and has given the status of a new Unitary University in the state of Odisha from 1 August 2021.

Academics
The university currently has twenty-two departments.

Departments

 Anthropology 
 BBA
 Bachelor of Education
 Botany & Biotech
 Chemistry 
 Commerce 
 Computer Science 
 Economics
 Education
 Electronics & Telecommunications
 English
 Geology
 Hindi
 Histrory
 MFA
 Mathematics 
 Master of Computer Application
 Odia
 Philosophy 
 Physics
 Political Science 
 Zoology

Facilities
 Central Bank of India with ATM
 Sub-Post Office
 Khallikote University Stadium

Alumni

 V. V. Giri, former President of India
 Bishwanath Das, Ex-Governor
 Chief Justice Lingaraj Panigrahi
 Justice B. Jagannadha Das
 Vice Admiral S. H. Sarma
 Nityananda Pradhan
 Ladu Kishore Swain
 Sisir Mishra
 Celina Jaitly
 Tamanna Vyas

References

External links
 

Department of Higher Education, Odisha
Autonomous Colleges of Odisha
Universities in Odisha
Education in Berhampur
Educational institutions established in 1878
1878 establishments in India
Academic institutions formerly affiliated with the University of Madras